Eremocoris is a genus of dirt-colored seed bugs in the family Rhyparochromidae. There are at least 45 described species in the genus Eremocoris.

Species
These 45 species belong to the genus Eremocoris:

References

Further reading

 
 
 
 

Drymini